Si3 may refer to:

 SI3, a diamond clarity guide
 Si3 (film), a 2017 Tamil language film